Taterillus is a genus of rodents. The species within this genus can only be reliably distinguished on the basis of karyotype, and not by external appearance.

The genus contains the following species:
 Robbins's tateril (Taterillus arenarius)
 Congo gerbil (Taterillus congicus)
 Emin's gerbil (Taterillus emini)
 Gracile tateril (Taterillus gracilis)
 Harrington's gerbil (Taterillus harringtoni) – doubtfully distinct from T. emini, which has the same chromosome count.
 Lake Chad gerbil (Taterillus lacustris)
 Petter's gerbil (Taterillus petteri)
 Senegal gerbil (Taterillus pygargus)
 Tranieri's tateril (Taterillus tranieri)

References

 
Rodent genera
 
Taxa named by Oldfield Thomas
Taxonomy articles created by Polbot